Hasty is an unincorporated community in Newton County, Arkansas, United States. Hasty has a post office with ZIP code 72640.

External links
 Newton County Historical Society

References

Unincorporated communities in Newton County, Arkansas
Unincorporated communities in Arkansas